David Patrick Jackson (16 September 1958 – August 2009) was an English professional footballer who played as a forward.

Career
Born in Wibsey, Jackson signed for Bradford City in July 1978 from Manchester United, leaving the club in May 1979. During his time with Bradford City he made 12 appearances in the Football League, scoring three goals He also made one appearance in the FA Cup. He also played for Exeter City.

Sources

References

1958 births
2009 deaths
English footballers
Manchester United F.C. players
Bradford City A.F.C. players
Exeter City F.C. players
English Football League players
Association football forwards
People from Wibsey